Ayot may refer to several things in Hertfordshire, England:

 Ayot St Lawrence, a village and parish, residence of George Bernard Shaw
 Ayot St Peter, a village and parish
 Ayot Green, a hamlet
 Ayot railway station, a former station near Ayot St Peter